Tadeusz Kutrzeba (15 April 1885 – 8 January 1947) was a general of the army during the Second Polish Republic. He served as a major general in the Polish Army in overall command of Army Poznań during the 1939 German Invasion of Poland.

Biography
Tadeusz Kutrzeba was born in Kraków, a part of Austria-Hungary, since the 1795 partition of Poland. His father was a captain in the Imperial Austrian Army. In 1896, he was admitted to a military school for children in Fischau near Wiener Neustadt. He then continued his studies in the city of Hranice. Kutrzeba completed his secondary education in 1903. He graduated with distinction from the Imperial and Royal Technical Military Academy in Mödling and was commissioned as a second lieutenant, in an explosives ordnance unit. On account of his performance in school, he was given the option of choosing the location of his first posting. He chose to return to his native Kraków where he was posted from 1906 to 1910. In 1910, Kutrzeba continued his military education in Vienna, studying engineering, and was promoted to the rank of lieutenant in 1911. From 1913 to 1914, he was posted to Sarajevo, where he witnessed the immediate catalyst for the outbreak of the First World War: the assassination of Archduke Ferdinand.

World War II

During the invasion of Poland in 1939, General Kutrzeba commanded the Poznań Army, composed of four infantry divisions (14, 17, 25, 26) and two cavalry brigades (Wielkopolska and Podolska). He devised the Polish counterattack plan of the battle of Bzura and commanded the Poznań and Pomorze Armies during the battle. In the aftermath, he fought his way to Warsaw and arrived in the capital on September 22, where he briefly became the deputy commander of the Warsaw Army. At the behest of major general Juliusz Rómmel (commander of the Warsaw Army), he began capitulation negotiations with the German 8th Army. On September 28, he signed the official surrender documents.

After the siege of Warsaw, he was captured by the Germans and spent the rest of the war in several prisoner of war camps: Hohenstein, Königstein and Oflag VII-A Murnau. General Kutrzeba remained a prisoner of war until April 1945, when Oflag VII-A Murnau was liberated by American forces. 

In April 1945 he was called to London, where he was offered the position of Minister of Defense in the Government-in-Exile, which he declined. Instead, he chose to head a historical commission that focused on the Polish Army’s military campaign in September 1939 and the contributions of Polish soldiers fighting in the West from 1939 to 1945.

Military promotions (Second Polish Republic)
 Major (1919)
 Lieutenant Colonel (1920)
 Colonel (1922)
 Brigadier General (1927)
 Major General (1939)

Death
General Kutrzeba was given an opportunity to return to Poland. Due to poor health, however, he was unable to travel. General Kutrzeba died in London on 8 January 1947. Reportedly, the cause of his death was cancer. He was buried with military honors at Brookwood Cemetery. He was posthumously awarded the Virtuti Militari War Order III class.

In 1957, his ashes – according to his last will – were transported to Poland and buried in Aleja Zasłużonych at the Powązki Military Cemetery in Warsaw (section A30-2 semicircle-8).

Honours and awards

Poland
 Commander's Cross of the Virtuti Militari, previously awarded the Knight's Cross and the Silver Cross (1921)
 Commander's Cross of the Order of Polonia Restituta (1930), previously awarded the Officer's Cross
 Cross of Valour - three times
 Gold Cross of Merit

Other
 Officer of the Legion of Honour (France)
 Commander's Cross of the Order of the Star of Romania
 Commander's Cross of the Order of the Crown (Belgium)
 Cross of Liberty, Class II (Estonia)
 Order of the Cross of the Eagle, Class II (1932, Estonia)
 Order of Lāčplēsis Third Class (Latvia)
 Academic Golden Laurel of the Polish Academy of Literature

References

1885 births
1947 deaths
Military personnel from Kraków
People from the Kingdom of Galicia and Lodomeria
Polish generals
Polish military writers
Polish people of World War I
Austro-Hungarian military personnel of World War I
Polish people of the Polish–Soviet War
People of the Polish May Coup (pro-government side)
Polish military personnel of World War II
Polish prisoners of war
World War II prisoners of war held by Germany
Commanders of the Virtuti Militari
Officiers of the Légion d'honneur
Commanders of the Order of Polonia Restituta
Recipients of the Cross of Valour (Poland)
Recipients of the Gold Cross of Merit (Poland)
Commanders of the Order of the Star of Romania
Commanders of the Order of the Crown (Belgium)
Recipients of the Military Order of the Cross of the Eagle, Class II
Recipients of the Order of Lāčplēsis, 3rd class
Golden Laurel of the Polish Academy of Literature